These are tables of congressional delegations from New Mexico to the United States House of Representatives and the United States Senate.

The deans of the New Mexico delegation are Senators Martin Heinrich and Ben Ray Luján, both having served in Congress since January 3, 2009. Heinrich has served in the Senate since 2013, and Luján since 2021. Both previously served in the House representing the 1st and 3rd districts respectively.

United States House of Representatives

Current members of the House 
List of members of the United States House of Representatives, their terms in office, district boundaries, and the district political ratings according to the CPVI. The delegation has a total of 3 members, all 3 Democrats.

Historical representatives

Pre-statehood

Post-statehood

United States Senate

Key

See also

List of United States congressional districts
New Mexico's congressional districts
Political party strength in New Mexico

Notes

References 

 
 
New Mexico
Politics of New Mexico
Congressional delegations